Big Rich Atlanta was an American reality television series on the Style Network. The series premiered on January 23, 2013. Big Rich Atlanta follows a group of wealthy Georgia women and their daughters who do whatever it takes to be at the top of the local social scene and in control of the action.

Cast
Virginia: Meyer and Harvin's mother, Virginia, moved in with them after her divorced was finalized. Virginia manages her daughters' business.
Harvin: Harvin is Virginia's eldest daughter and is 30 years old. She owns a clothing and jewelry line named She Blames Me.
Meyer: Meyer is 28 years old. She is part owner of her joint business She Blames Me.
Sabrina: Sabrina is a newly single pastor. She had a successful dancing career but turned it into a career in international dance ministry.
Anandi: Anandi is a 19‑year‑old sophomore in college. She admits that she's a nerd but she also has an interest in beauty and fashion which has led to her partaking in beauty pageants.
Marcia: Marcia is Meagan's mother and is an interior designer. She's working with her daughter to launch a mobile fashion truck business.
Meagan: Meagan is a licensed real estate agent. She and her mother are currently working on opening Atlanta's first mobile boutique.
Ashlee: Ashlee is a former Miss Georgia Teen. She was married at a young age but is now divorced. Ashlee lives in a penthouse apartment that was inherited from her grandfather.
Katie: Katie is a fourth generation Atlantan. She is a mother of two and is married.
Diana: Diana is one of Katie's children, and is 17 years old. She's involved in the world of competitive cheerleading.
Sharlinda: Sharlinda is co-owner of Tu La 2 Nail salon, which she runs with her twin sister, Brie. She is married to Q. Parker of the R&B group 112.
Kahdijiha: Kahdijiha is 26 years old and the daughter of Sharlinda.
Brié: Brié is Sharlinda's twin sister and serves as a second mom to Kahdijiha.

Episodes

References

2010s American reality television series
2013 American television series debuts
2013 American television series endings
English-language television shows
Style Network original programming
Television shows set in Atlanta